Qaqapatan (Quechua) is an archaeological site with rock paintings in Peru.

See also 
 Kunturmarka
 Markapukyu
 Q'illaywasin

References

Archaeological sites in Pasco Region
Archaeological sites in Peru
Rock art in South America